Yarema is a given name and surname. Alternative transliterations include Jarema and Iarema.

People

Given name
Jeremi Wiśniowiecki (1612–1651), aristocrat in the Polish-Lithuanian Commonwealth
Yarema Kavatsiv (born 1986), Ukrainian footballer
Yarema Kovaliv (born 1976), Ukrainian administrator

Surname
Brendan Yarema (born 1976), Canadian ice hockey player
Dymytriy (Yarema) (1915–2000), Ukrainian Orthodox patriarch
Tyler Yarema (born 1972), Canadian singer/songwriter
Vitaly Yarema (born 1963), Ukrainian politician

See also
 

Ukrainian-language surnames